Undekhi (English: Unseen) is an Indian Hindi-language crime thriller web television series which premiered on SonyLIV on 10 July 2020. It is produced by Applause Entertainment and Edgestorm Ventures. The series depicts the two aspects of the society - the power-drunk influential people who think they can get away with anything and the oppressed, subjected to years of torture, who finally decide to bring themselves to justice.

Undekhi season 2 was released on March 4, 2022.

Premise

Season 1

Undekhi begins in Sunderbans but soon shifts to Manali. In less than 30 minutes, viewers witness two murders. DSP Barun Ghosh (Dibyendu Bhattacharya) is investigating the Sunderban murder of a policeman, whose mutilated body is found in the forest. Two tribal girls are on the run and Ghosh, who suspects them to be the killers is on their trail.

Season 2
With the cliff-hanging end of season one of Undekhi, a new face called Abhaya finds Koyal and rescues her. On the other hand, Teji is determined to destroy the Atwal, and Daman is onboard with her. This season has another wedding of everyone's favorite Rinku Paaji. Shashwat and Saloni manage to escape and are in hiding. The Atwal's are all set to expand their operations and unleash a reign of terror, by forging powerful business alliances with international drug dealers. However, the family is increasingly estranged and soon it becomes a massive conflict of power and position.

Cast and characters 
Dibyendu Bhattacharya as DSP Barun Ghosh, a policeman from West Bengal.
Surya Sharma as Rinku Atwal aka Rajendra Singh Atwal
Harsh Chhaya as Papaji
Anchal Singh as Teji Grewal Atwal
Ankur Rathee as Daman Atwal, Papaji's son
Abhishek Chauhan as Rishi, the videographer
Ayn Zoya as Saloni, head of wedding film team
Apeksha Porwal as Koyal, Adivasi girl from Sundarbans
Karmveer Choudhary as Kandpal 
Mandeep Bamra as Lovely Singh
Vaarun Bhagat as Lucky
Sayandeep Sengupta as Shashwat Sinha
Meenakshi Sethi as Papaji's wife
Shivaani Sopuri as Rinku's Mother
Shivangi Singh as Muskaan
Season 2
Meiyang Chang as Abhay
Jamie Alter as Issac Azra
Breshna Khan as Gerri Esher
Tej Sapru as Arjan Singh
Nandish Sandhu as Samarth

Seasons
Season 1 consists of 10 episodes.

Season 1

Season 2

Reception

Season 1

Undekhi received mostly positive reviews from critics and audiences. Rajkumar Rao appreciated the show on twitter on the date of the release on his twitter page. Pramit Chatterjee of Mashable said it an Impressive show quoting "Undekhi is made of stories and people that we’ve met whose actions make them live in our minds rent-free. It’s what builds the sentiment that we as a nation are truly not free. Yes, the British have left us. But what about our privilege, classism, racism, communal divisions, power dynamics, corruption, etc? Did they take it with them? No. It still exists." Ronak Kotecha of The Times of India said it "An Engrossing and Gritty Crime Drama" giving it 3.5 stars out of 5. Avinash Ramachandran of Indian Express praised the performances of the actors saying "Competent performances power this thriller".

Season 2
Undekhi Season 2  received a number of positive responses from the audience.  The Times of India gave the show 3.5 stars, "Apart from a crisp script, ‘Undekhi 2’ boasts of solid performances." Filmibeat lauded the performance with "Surya Sharma & Anchal Singh once again impress with their deadly chemistry as they go head to head for power in the Atwal family."

The Free Press Journal's words for the show were, "With the kind of performances this one had, one hopes that there is more. A brilliant show indeed!". Undekhi Season 2 tops Season 1 with delicious mysteries & exhilarating chase scenes", India Forums noted.

Undekhi season 2 is more of the same, and at the top of the game –  said Subhask K Jha of Bollyspice. Bizasia gave the show 4 stars and quoted "It doesn't go unnoticed that the colorful characters from the first season return with a bang in this second part."

Controversies
As a part of the promotional activity, citizens received 'fake murder calls' from the network. The call has a man's trembling voice saying that he has witnessed a murder and that he is about to get murdered too. At the end of the call, it is revealed that this is a promotional call for the web show. Many people started taking the call seriously, and took to Twitter to express shock. Finally, Sony LIV tweeted that it was a promotional activity. “If you have received a call for our show...and it has disturbed you, we would like to sincerely apologize to you. This was a test activity which has gone out accidentally,” it said.

References

External links
 
 Undekhi on SonyLIV

2020 Indian television series debuts
Indian crime television series
Hindi-language web series
Indian thriller television series